Route 970 is a  long provincial highway located entirely in Westmorland County, New Brunswick, Canada. The highway connects Nova Scotia Route 366 at Tidnish Bridge, Nova Scotia to Route 15 and Route 16 at Port Elgin. The road is one of only three public roads crossing the provincial boundary on the Isthmus of Chignecto; the other two being Route 2/Nova Scotia Highway 104 (Trans-Canada Highway) and the Mount Whately Road. It is the only land crossing between the two provinces.

Route description
Route 970 begins  from a junction with Nova Scotia Route 366 along the provincial boundary between Nova Scotia and New Brunswick. The highway travels north, roughly parallel to the Tindish River as it traverses southern Westmorland County, passing Big Cove to the west before entering Baie Verte. The highway turns northeast along Main Street before crossing two bridges near Fletcher Island, continuing northeast until reaching the town of Port Elgin. The highway turns onto Shemogue Road and comes to a terminus at a roundabout intersection, which serves as the southern terminus of Route 15, and an intersection on Route 16.

Major intersections

References

970
Roads in Westmorland County, New Brunswick